Ken Skupski and Neal Skupski were the defending champions but failed to defend their title, losing in the finals to Purav Raja and Divij Sharan 6–4, 7–6(7–3).

Seeds

Draw

External Links
 Main Draw

Aegon Surbiton Trophy - Men's Doubles
2016 Doubles